Francesco Pernigo (10 June 1918 – 15 December 1985) was an Italian footballer who played as a forward. He competed in the men's tournament at the 1948 Summer Olympics with the Italy national football team.

References

External links
 

1918 births
1985 deaths
Italian footballers
Italy international footballers
Olympic footballers of Italy
Footballers at the 1948 Summer Olympics
Footballers from Verona
Association football forwards
Venezia F.C. players
Modena F.C. players
Aurora Pro Patria 1919 players
Hellas Verona F.C. players
Serie A players
Serie B players
Serie C players